Raúl Alcalá Gallegos (born 3 March 1964) is a Mexican former professional road racing cyclist, who competed between 1985 and 1999 and again in 2008 and 2010. As an amateur, Alcalá competed in the 1984 Summer Olympics in Los Angeles, finishing in eleventh place and 17th with his team in the 100 km team time trial. In 1986, Alcalá became the first Mexican cyclist to compete in the Tour de France and to date has been the most successful Mexican cyclist. In the 1987 Tour de France, he won the young rider classification.  In both 1989 and 1990, he won a stage in the Tour de France and finished in 8th place. A capable General Classification rider Alcalá finished in the top 10 during five different Grand Tours. In 2008, Alcalá returned to professional racing by competing in the Vuelta Chihuahua. In 2010, he won the national time trial championship at the age of 46. In early 2011, he stated his intention to race at the 2011 Pan American Games, but eventually did not compete.

Career achievements

Major results

1985
 3rd Overall Redlands Classic
1986
 2nd Overall Redlands Classic
1st Prologue
 9th Overall Coors Classic
1st Stage 6
1987
 1st  Overall Coors Classic
1st Prologue, Stages 1 & 13
 1st Stage 1 Giro del Trentino
 2nd Züri-Metzgete
 9th Overall Tour de France
1st  Young rider classification
1988
 8th Clásica de San Sebastián
1989
 1st  Overall Ruta Mexico
1st  Points classification
1st Stages 10, 11, 14 & 15
 4th Giro di Lombardia
 5th Züri-Metzgete
 8th Overall Tour de France
1st Stage 3
 9th Volta a Catalunya
1st Stage 2b (TTT)
 9th UCI Road World Cup
1990
 1st  Overall Ruta Mexico
1st  Points classification
1st Stages 7 & 14
 1st  Overall Tour de Trump
1st Prologue & Stage 8
 1st  Overall Vuelta a Asturias
 8th Overall Tour de France
1st Stage 7 (ITT)
 8th La Flèche Wallonne
1991
 1st Stage 5 Tour of the Basque Country
 3rd Overall Tirreno–Adriatico
 6th Liège–Bastogne–Liège
 7th Overall Vuelta a España
1992
 1st Clásica de San Sebastián
 2nd Overall Tour of the Basque Country
 2nd Overall Tirreno–Adriatico
 2nd Overall Nissan Classic
 3rd Overall Setmana Catalana de Ciclisme
1st Stage 3
 4th UCI Road World Cup
 4th Giro di Lombardia
 6th Wincanton Classic
 8th Overall Vuelta a España
1993
 1st  Overall Tour DuPont
1st Stage 11
 Critérium du Dauphiné Libéré
1st Prologue & Stage 3
 2nd Overall Vuelta a Burgos
1st Stage 5
1994
 1st  Overall Ruta Mexico
1st Stages 4 (TTT) & 9
 1st Stage 4 Tour DuPont
 3rd Klasika Primavera
2010
 1st  Time trial, National Road Championships

Grand Tour general classification results timeline

References

External links

Official Tour de France results for Raúl Alcalá

Living people
Mexican male cyclists
Sportspeople from Monterrey
Cyclists at the 1984 Summer Olympics
Olympic cyclists of Mexico
Mexican Tour de France stage winners
1964 births